Federal Socialist Party was a political party of Nepal led by Ashok Rai formed in 2012.

History 
Ashok Rai who was the vice-chair of CPN (UML) and Rajendra Prasad Shrestha, a central committee member of the party, broke away from the CPN (UML) to form the Federal Socialist Party in November 2012. They accused the CPN (UML) leadership of not listening to the aspirations of Janajati leaders within the party and organized a new party to contest the 2013 Constituent Assembly election. The party failed to get any constituency seats but won five proportional seats to the 2nd Constituent Assembly. This party merged with Madhesi Jana Adhikar Forum, Nepal and Khas Samabesi Party in June 2015 to form the Federal Socialist Forum, Nepal.

Electoral performance

References

Socialist parties in Nepal
Federalist parties in Nepal
2012 establishments in Nepal
2015 disestablishments in Nepal
Political parties established in 2012
Political parties disestablished in 2015